The 1990 World Cup took place  at the Grand Cypress Resort Golf Club in Orlando, Florida, United States. It was the 36th World Cup event. The tournament was a 72-hole stroke play team event with 32 teams. Each team consisted of two players from a country. The combined score of each team determined the team results. The German team of Bernhard Langer and Torsten Giedeon won by three strokes over the England team of Mark James and Richard Boxall and the Ireland team of David Feherty and Ronan Rafferty in a share of second place. The victory was the first international sports victory for the united country of Germany, since the reunification of East and West Germany a month earlier.  The individual competition was won by Payne Stewart, United States.

Teams 

(a)  denotes amateur

Scores
Team

International Trophy

Sources:

References

World Cup (men's golf)
Golf in Florida
Sports competitions in Orlando, Florida
World Cup
World Cup golf
International sports competitions in Florida